A presidential election was held in the Socialist Republic of Romania on 28 March 1974. It was the first election held after the post of President of the Republic was created by an amendment to the Constitution earlier in the year.

Nicolae Ceaușescu, incumbent General Secretary of the Romanian Communist Party and president of the State Council, was elected by the Great National Assembly as the first President of the Republic on 28 March 1974; he was the only candidate. On 4 April 1974, the Communist Party daily Scînteia published a congratulatory telegram, in which Salvador Dalí actually mocked Ceaușescu on his "introducing the presidential scepter". Being successively re-elected, Ceaușescu served as the president until 22 December 1989.

Candidate

References

External links
Istoria institutiei prezidentiale in Romania

1974
1974 elections in Europe
Presidential election
Nicolae Ceaușescu
March 1974 events in Europe